Spencer L. Seager is Professor of Chemistry at Weber State University.

History
He received his B.S. degree in chemistry and Ph.D. in physical chemistry from the University of Utah under the dean of science at the time, Henry Eyring; his adviser was J. Calvin Giddings.

He began teaching at WSU in 1960. He served as chemistry department chairman from 1969 to 1993.

Subjects taught
He teaches introductory, general, and physical chemistry at the university and is also active in projects to help improve chemistry and other science education in local elementary schools.

Books
Introductory Chemistry for Today
Chemistry for Today: General, Organic, and Biochemistry
Organic and Biochemistry for Today
Safety Scale Laboratory Experiments for Chemistry For Today: General, Organic, and Biochemistry
Environmental Chemistry: Air and Water Pollution

Publications

"Energy, from Source to Use"
"Rapid Determination of Gaseous Diffusion Coefficients by Means of Gas Chromatography Apparatus"
"Temperature Dependence of Gas and Vapor Diffusion Coefficients"
"Plate height in coiled columns"
"Plate Height in Gas Chromatography"
"Colorimetric Determination of Low Concentrations of Primary and Secondary Alcohols"
"Rapid Diffusional Analysis by Chromatographic Methods"
"Environmental Chemistry: Air and Water Pollution"

References

University of Utah alumni
Weber State University faculty
Living people
American physical chemists
Year of birth missing (living people)